State Route 247 (SR 247) is a  long north–south state highway in the southern part of the U.S. state of Ohio. The northern terminus of SR 247 is at a signalized intersection with State Route 73 in Hillsboro.

Route description
SR 247 travels through the western half of Adams County and the southern portion of Highland County.  There are no segments of SR 247 that are included within the National Highway System (NHS).  The NHS is a network of highways identified as being most important for the economy, mobility and defense of the nation.

History
The SR 247 designation was established in 1925.  The highway was originally routed along its present alignment from its southern terminus northeast of Manchester to downtown West Union, replacing what was designated as SR 137.

In 1937, SR 247 was extended north to its present endpoint in Hillsboro, via a previously un-numbered roadway north to the current intersection with SR 137 south of Seaman, then what was the portion of SR 137 from that point north to the current western terminus of SR 785 (also was a part of SR 137 to that point), and finally along another un-numbered roadway from the point of the present SR 785 junction north into Hillsboro.

Major intersections

References

247
Transportation in Adams County, Ohio
Transportation in Highland County, Ohio